There are 29 Indian reservations in the U.S. state of Washington.



List of reservations

See also
Indigenous peoples of the Pacific Northwest Coast
List of federally recognized tribes in Washington
List of Indian reservations in the United States

References

External links

Washington Tribes

 
Reservations in Washington (state)
Indian Reservations
Indian reservations